Where Love Has Gone is a 1962 novel by Harold Robbins.

It was the basis for a film of the same name in 1964, with Robbins's work adapted for the screen by John Michael Hayes.  It was produced by Joseph E. Levine for Paramount Pictures and was directed by Edward Dmytryk.

There were parallels between the events in the book and the death of Johnny Stompanato, Lana Turner's boyfriend.

Novels by Harold Robbins
1962 American novels
Roman à clef novels
American novels adapted into films